Bardal is a village in the municipality of Leirfjord in Nordland county, Norway. The village surrounds the Bardalselva river which flows into the fjord. The Bardal Church was built in 1887 on a hill near the mouth of the river. The Bardal area has historically been part of both Nesna Municipality (to the north) and Hemnes Municipality (to the east), but it has been part of Leirfjord Municipality since 1964.

Culture
Wangbrygga is a folk museum located by the river outlet in Bardal. The museum has free entry and is open some days a week in the summer. The museum features a replica of an old time General Store, a cafe and a small assembly hall used for concerts, courses and meetings.

Tourism
Bardal has a RV / Camping park and marked footpaths into the mountains.

References

External links
Map of area (norgeskart.no)
Bardal.info
Announcement page Wangbrygga (Norwegian)
Bardal Camping website

Leirfjord
Villages in Nordland